Set the World on Fire may refer to:

Albums
 Set the World on Fire (Annihilator album) or the title song (see below), 1993
 Set the World on Fire (Black Veil Brides album) or the title song, 2011
 Set the World on Fire (Gioeli-Castronovo album) or the title song, 2018
 Set the World on Fire, by Liar, or the title song, 1978

Songs
 "Set the World on Fire" (E-Type song), 1994
 "Set the World on Fire" (Luca Hänni song), 2015
 "Set the World on Fire", by Annihilator from Set the World on Fire, 1993
 "Set the World on Fire", by Britt Nicole from Say It, 2007
 "Set the World on Fire", by Lovebites from Electric Pentagram, 2020
 "Set the World on Fire (The Lie of Lies)", by Symphony X from Paradise Lost, 2007

See also 
 Set the World on Fire Tour, a 2013 concert tour by Alicia Keys
 "I Don't Want to Set the World on Fire", a 1938 song recorded by several performers
 "Set the World Afire", a song by Megadeth from So Far, So Good... So What!, 1988
 "Set this World on Fire", a song by the Janoskians, 2012